Castillo de La Calahorra is located in La Calahorra, in the province of Granada, Spain. It is situated in the Sierra Nevada foothills. Built between 1509 and 1512, it was one of the first Italian Renaissance castles to be built outside Italy. It was declared a Bien de Interés Cultural monument in 1922.
It was featured in the 1974 film Stardust, as the retreat of Jim MacLaine (played by David Essex) in the latter parts of the film. It was also used as a manse in the city of Pentos for the 2022 television series House of the Dragon.

Photo gallery

References

External links

Page on castillosnet.org

Houses completed in 1512
Bien de Interés Cultural landmarks in the Province of Granada
Castles in Andalusia